Nawa'akoa Lisiate Foti Analeseanoa "Koa" Misi (born January 17, 1987) is a former American football outside linebacker. He played college football at Utah.

College career
After graduation from Montgomery High School, Misi began his college career at Santa Rosa Junior College, where he was a first-team all-conference defensive end. He then attended the University of Utah and played for the Utes for three years (2007–2009). While at Utah, he played in 38 of 39 games, missing one game due to injury, and started 36 of those games. He played at both defensive end and defensive tackle positions during his college career. He was twice selected as an all-conference player in the Mountain West Conference, second-team all-conference in 2008 and first-team all-conference in 2009.

Professional career
On April 23, 2010, Misi was drafted by the Miami Dolphins with a second round pick. He was drafted with the 40th overall pick.

On September 19, 2010, Misi's second career game in the NFL, he recovered a Brett Favre fumble in the end zone for a touchdown giving the Dolphins a 14–0 lead. Misi also had two tackles. On September 7, 2013, Misi signed a four-year, $17 million contract extension with the Dolphins. Due to a back injury, Misi was placed on the team's injured reserve on December 22, 2015. On October 10, 2016, Misi was placed on injured reserve due to a neck injury.

On July 25, 2017, the Dolphins placed Misi on injured reserve with a neck injury.

NFL statistics

References

External links

 Utah Utes bio 
 Miami Dolphins bio 

1987 births
Living people
American people of Tongan descent
Players of American football from California
American football linebackers
American football defensive ends
Sportspeople from Santa Rosa, California
Utah Utes football players
Miami Dolphins players